The Samsung Galaxy A22 5G is a mid-range Android-based smartphone developed and manufactured by Samsung Electronics as a part of Galaxy A series. The phone was first released on 24 June 2021. The phone comes with a triple rear camera setup and a 90 Hz display. The battery has 5000 mAh, which is 62% bigger than the battery of the iPhone 13 Pro.

Specifications

Design 
The Samsung Galaxy A22 5G has a 6.6 inch Infinity-V display with a V-shaped notch at top. The frame and the back panel of the device is made of plastic. There is a side-mounted capacitive fingerprint reader at the right side and a triple rear camera setup with an LED flash at the back. The phone measures 167.2 x 76.4 x 9.0 mm and weighs 203 grams. It is available with Gray, White, Mint and Violet color options in most markets.

Hardware 
Samsung Galaxy A22 5G is powered by the MediaTek Dimensity 700 SoC with 7 nm process, an octa core CPU comprising a high performance cluster with 2x 2.2 Ghz Cortex-A76 cores and a high efficiency cluster with 6x 2.0 Ghz Cortex-A55 cores, Mali G57-MC2 GPU and an integrated 5G modem along with up to 8 GB of RAM.  

The phone has 4 GB RAM + 64 GB internal storage and 4/6/8GB RAM + 128GB internal storage configurations, internal storage can be expanded further by installing a microSD card. The device supports 5G, 4G LTE, Wi-Fi, Bluetooth and GPS/ A-GPS. There is a speaker, a USB Type-C port and a 3.5 mm audio jack at the bottom.  It has a 5000mAh non-removable battery with 15W fast charging support.

The phone has a 6.6 inch PLS TFT LCD display with 20:9 aspect ratio, 1080x2400 resolution, ~399 ppi pixel density and 90 Hz refresh rate.

The phone has a triple camera setup with a 48 MP main camera, a 5 MP wide-angle camera and a 2 MP depth sensor. There is an 8 MP front-facing camera located in the V-shaped notch of the display.

Software 
Samsung Galaxy A22 5G runs on Android 11 and One UI Core 3.1.

Release

India
The Samsung Galaxy A22 5G was released in India on 23 July 2021 with 6 or 8 GB RAM and 128 GB internal storage. 6 GB model costs Rs.19999 and 8 GB model costs Rs. 21999. However, the device is not available in white.

The device has a twin model called the Samsung Galaxy F42 5G with different color options, 64 MP main camera and a slightly different camera setup. It was launched exclusively in India through Flipkart. It is available with 6 or 8 GB RAM and 128 GB internal storage. Mint, Violet and White color options are not available for this model.

Europe
The Samsung Galaxy A22 5G was also released in some regions of Europe, with 4 GB RAM with 64 GB internal storage or 4/6/8 GB RAM with 128 GB internal storage. The phone starts from €230, with the 64 GB model costing €230 and the 128 GB model with 4 GB RAM costing €250. By European standards, the device is classified as a phablet for its 6.6-inch screen size.

Samsung Galaxy Wide5
The Samsung Galaxy Wide5 was released in South Korea for the South Korean carrier SK Telecom as a South Korean exclusive model. Compared to the Galaxy A22 5G, this variant features a slightly different rear camera setup design, a 64 MP main camera instead of the 48 MP unit and different color options. It is available with 6 GB RAM and 128 GB internal storage. It is available in Black, White and Blue.

See also 
Samsung Galaxy A series

References 

Samsung Galaxy
Mobile phones introduced in 2021
Android (operating system) devices
Samsung smartphones
Mobile phones with multiple rear cameras